SeaWorld San Antonio is a  marine mammal park, oceanarium and animal theme park in the Westover Hills District of San Antonio, Texas, on the city's west side. It is the largest of the three parks in the SeaWorld chain owned and operated by SeaWorld Parks & Entertainment and one of the world's largest marine-life theme parks focused on conservation, education and animal rescue. It is a member of the Alliance of Marine Mammal Parks and Aquariums (AMMPA) and is accredited by the Association of Zoos and Aquariums (AZA). 

The park features a variety of marine life, including dolphins, sea lions, and killer whales, as well as other animals like flamingos, pelicans and alligators. The park hosts a range of attractions and shows, including live animal shows, rides, and educational exhibits. Some of the main attractions include the killer whale show, "One Ocean", and the sea lion and otter show, "Clyde & Seamore's Sea Lion High."

History

The park, initially called Sea World of Texas, was developed by Harcourt, Brace and Jovanovich (now Houghton Mifflin Harcourt). Built for $170 million, it opened on May 27, 1988 and 75,000 people attended the opening. It had 3.3 million visitors in its first 12 months of operation, placing it among the Top 10 attractions in Texas. At the time of its debut, it was billed as "the largest educational, marine-life theme park in the world."

In 1989, Harcourt, Brace and Jovanovich (heavy in debt and fighting a hostile takeover) sold its SeaWorld and Boardwalk and Baseball theme parks to Anheuser-Busch, Inc. Plans to build a second Boardwalk and Baseball park adjacent to Sea World San Antonio were abandoned.

On November 26, 1988, Kayla (stage named "Baby Shamu") was the first killer whale born at the park. At the time of her death on January 28, 2019, she resided at SeaWorld Orlando.

Under Anheuser-Busch ownership, the park closed less popular attractions consisting of the Texas Walk, Cypress Gardens West, Joplin Square, U.S. Map Plaza, and the Garden of Flags and added its Budweiser Clydesdales to the park.

In 2008, Anheuser-Busch merged with InBev; soon after, the newly merged company sold the SeaWorld parks to Blackstone Group.

In March 2016, SeaWorld Entertainment announced that the current generation of killer whales at it parks would be the last. SeaWorld San Antonio currently houses 5 killer whales. It was also announced that the theatrical killer whale shows would be phased out and replaced with more naturalistic Orca Encounters. SeaWorld San Antonio's Orca Encounter opened on February 22, 2020.

From 14 March to 18 June 2020, in line with other SeaWorld parks, the park was temporarily closed due to the COVID-19 pandemic.

Attractions

Roller coasters and rides

Live entertainment and animal presentations

Animal inventory

Killer whales

SeaWorld's killer whales are housed in Shamu Theater, most of whom were born at SeaWorld except Kyuquot who was born at the defunct Sealand of the Pacific in Canada. There are currently 5 killer whales, Takara (F, Matriarch), Sakari (F), Kamea (F), Tuar (M), and  Kyuquot (M).

Beluga whales
SeaWorld San Antonio has one of the most prolific beluga breeding programs in any zoological facility in the United States. Half of the belugas currently at the facility were born at the park and several belugas at other US facilities were originally born here. 

This park has also been selected the permanent home of a rescued Cook Inlet beluga named Tyonek who was deemed unreleasable due to his young age and lack of survival skills.  They were chosen due to their diverse beluga population of experienced mothers and younger belugas close to his age, but surprisingly he ended up bonding with Betty, one of the park's Pacific white-sided dolphins. 

As of 2022, SeaWorld San Antonio has 10 belugas.

Dolphins

SeaWorld has 18 bottlenose dolphins that live in 2 different areas of the park. Discovery Point is where most of the park's female dolphins live, where they do interaction programs and are also on display via above water and underwater viewing areas. Zoological Support is a backstage area where all of the park's male dolphins live and where other animals could go for breeding purposes, specialized veterinary care, etc. While most dolphins were born within the SeaWorld parks except Notchfin, 4 of these dolphins are also rescued dolphins that were deemed nonreleasable by the National Marine Fisheries Service.

They also have 6 Pacific white-sided dolphins that live at Beluga Stadium. SeaWorld San Antonio is one of three zoological facilities in the United States that cares for Pacific white-sided dolphins.

Sea Lions, Seals, and Otters

In addition to the performing sea lions and otters, there is a large population of California sea lions and harbor seals living at this open air exhibit. Pinniped feeding opportunities are available for an additional fee. Unique to this SeaWorld is an exhibit for the park's Asian small-clawed and African spot-necked otters, while the other parks' freshwater otters can only be seen during shows.

Sea Turtles

The newest animal exhibit in the park which opened in May 2019 featuring rescued loggerhead and green sea turtles that live with schools of marine fish. It also has a natural biofiltration system consisting of an adjacent salt marsh with bacteria in the plant roots that feed on animal waste.

Aquatica San Antonio

Aquatica is a water park that was formerly a section of the park under the name, Lost Lagoon, which opened in 1993 and closed on September 5, 2011 to be replaced by Aquatica San Antonio, a separate gated water park based on the original Aquatica Orlando. The new park opened on Memorial Day weekend May 2012.

Attendance

References

External links

 
1988 establishments in Texas
Buildings and structures in San Antonio
Oceanaria in the United States
SeaWorld Parks & Entertainment
Tourist attractions in San Antonio
Zoos in Texas
Zoos established in 1988